A sister school is usually a pair of schools, usually single-sex school, one with female students and the other with male students. This relationship is seen to benefit both schools. For instance, when Harvard University was a male-only school, Radcliffe University was its sister school. The sister school concept as a single-sex school began to change as several institutions adopted coeducational environments starting in the 1970s due to the increasing awareness or consciousness about sex bias and discrimination.

Background
The term sister school (or brother school) has several alternate meanings:
 a definite financial commerce between two colleges or universities
 two schools that have a strong historical connection
 two schools which have social activities involving students from both schools
 two schools under the same management
 two schools built using the same floor plan/layout
 two schools in different nations that have established a collaborative international partnership.

See also
Seven Sisters (colleges)

References

External links

Dictionary definition
A collaborative international partnership

Types of university or college
School terminology